Al Wade'a District  is a district of the Abyan Governorate, Yemen. As of 2003, the district had a population of 23,400 inhabitants. The former president of Yemen Abdrabbuh Mansur Hadi comes from Thukain, which lies in Al Wade'a District.

References

Districts of Abyan Governorate